Pietro Donato (1380–1447) was a Venetian Renaissance humanist and the Bishop of Padua (from 1428). He was a noted bibliophile, epigraphist, collector, and patron of art. 

Born to a patrician family, Pietro received his education at the humanist boarding school of Gasparino Barzazzi. Promoted by Biagio Pelacani, he eventually received an arts degree from the University of Padua. He was a Thomist. As a humanist he kept a correspondence with Poggio Bracciolini. 

After the death of Franciscus Zabarella, papatu dignissimus iudicatus ("adjudged worthy of the papacy"), in late September 1417 at the Council of Constance, Pietro was one of those attending who, along with Barzazzi and Pierpaolo Vergerio, composed a eulogy for the cardinal. Pietro and Giovanni Berardi, Archbishop of Taranto, were co-presidents of the Council of Basel appointed by Pope Eugene IV. He and Berardi protested the Council after the eighteenth session (26 June 1434) re-affirmed the Haec sancta and the twenty-first session (9 June 1435) abolished the annates. On 11 August 1435 the Council officially reprimanded them, requesting that they lose their objections. Pietro later toured southern Germany in 1437. He attended the Council of Florence in 1438–39 and 1442. 

For Pietro Donato, the year 1436 was an auspicious for manuscript-commissioning. First, there is an illuminated Latin Gospel book, now manuscript 180 in the Pierpont Morgan Library, that was created for Donato in Padua in 1436. The chief illuminator was Johannes de Monterchio, while the frontispiece was by Peronet Lamy. 

Second, Pietro commissioned an illustrated copy of the Notitia Dignitatum in 1436; it now resides as MS Canon. Misc. 378 in the Bodleian Library. The manuscript of the Notitia which Pietro had copied was one he had found in Speyer, the Codex Spirensis earlier that year attending the council at Basel; its discovery influenced the Roma instaurata of Flavius Blondus. The work of Frontinus on the aqueducts of Rome and Vitruvius's De architectura were preserved in very poor manuscripts until Giovanni Giocondo edited them in the 1430s, for presentation to Pietro. 

As an epigraphist, Pietro compiled ancient inscriptions and collected many ancient artefacts. The Codex Hamilton, MS 254 in the Staatsbibliothek zu Berlin, was such an epigraphic collectanea. It was compiled, at least in part (folios 81–90), by Ciriaco d'Ancona, and based on one of his three visits to Athens (1436, 1437–8, and 1444). With the aid of a scribe and a draughtsman, Ciriaco created a portfolio of sketches of several ancient Greek ruins, most notably the Parthenon, for Pietro. 

Pietro possessed an exemplary copy of the Chronicon of Eusebius in Jerome's translation. He also owned 358 manuscripts of Thomas Aquinas, including the Prima pars and the Prima secundae. 

It has been suggested that Pietro, among other Paduan humanists, like Ciriaco, Francesco Barbaro, Jacopo Zeno, Palla Strozzi, and Leon Battista Alberti, may have influenced the classicism of the work of Donatello—especially his equestrian monument to Gattamelata—during his Paduan years (1444–53), when he had a studio near the Santo. 

Pietro had work done on the episcopal palace during his tenure. In 1437 he contracted one Giovanni da Ulma to redecorate the chapel of San Massimo there. In 1444 Pietro commissioned Giovanni da Firenze to make the current font for the baptistry; Giovanni also repaved the interior and redid the tombs. In 1445 he completely rebuilt the bishop's residence in a sumptuous manner.

Notes

1380 births
1447 deaths
Bishops of Padua
15th-century Italian writers
15th-century Italian Roman Catholic bishops